Kilby Butte Colony is a Hutterite community and census-designated place (CDP) in Musselshell County, Montana, United States. It is on the north side of the Musselshell River, an east-flowing tributary of the Missouri River.

The community was first listed as a CDP prior to the 2020 census.

Demographics

References 

Census-designated places in Musselshell County, Montana
Census-designated places in Montana
Hutterite communities in the United States